Glenn Joseph "Jake" Lawlor (July 27, 1907 – July 11, 1980) was an American football player, coach of football, basketball, and baseball and college athletics administrator. He served as the head football coach at the University of Nevada, Reno from 1952 to 1954, compiling a record of 6–10. Lawlor was also the head basketball coach at Nevada in 1942–43 and again from 1945 to 1959, amassing a record of 204–156. He was Nevada's head baseball coach from 1957 to 1960 and the school's athletic director from 1951 to 1969.

Lawlor died on July 11, 1980, at the age of 72, following treatment at St. Mary's Hospital in Reno for cancer. Opened in 1983, Lawlor Events Center on the University of Nevada, Reno campus, is named for him.

Head coaching record

Football

References

External links
 

1907 births
1980 deaths
Basketball coaches from Iowa
Basketball coaches from Nevada
Baseball coaches from Iowa
Baseball coaches from Nevada
Deaths from cancer in Nevada
Nevada Wolf Pack athletic directors
Nevada Wolf Pack baseball coaches
Nevada Wolf Pack football coaches
Nevada Wolf Pack football players
Nevada Wolf Pack men's basketball coaches
People from Victor, Iowa
Players of American football from Iowa